The WTA Tour is a worldwide top-tier tennis tour for women organized by the Women's Tennis Association. The second-tier tour is the WTA 125K series, and third-tier is the ITF Women's Circuit. The men's equivalent is the ATP Tour.

WTA Tour tournaments

Structure (2021–present)
The WTA Tour underwent slight change in the classification of tournaments in 2021, which were organized on par with the nomenclature used on ATP Tour:
Grand Slam tournaments (4)
Year-ending WTA Finals (1)
WTA 1000 tournaments (9):
 Mandatory: Four combined tournaments with male professional players with prize money ranging from US$6.5 million to US$8.3 million. These tournaments are held in Indian Wells, Miami, Madrid, and Beijing. However, Beijing tournament could not be held in 2021–22 due to the impact of Covid-19 Pandemic.
 Non-mandatory: Five events in Doha/Dubai, Rome, Montreal/Toronto, Cincinnati, and Wuhan with prize money ranging from US$2.3 million to US$2.7 million. In 2021–22, the tournament in Wuhan was suspended due to Covid–19 Pandemic. Also, in 2022, a new WTA 1000 tournament was held in Guadalajara as a replacement for Wuhan.
WTA 500 tournaments: 12 events with prize money from US$700,000 to US$900,000.
WTA 250 tournaments: There are nearly 30 tournaments, with prize money at US$250,000.

Structure (2009–2020)
The WTA Tour comprised from 2009 to the 2020 reorganization:
Grand Slam tournaments (4)
Year-ending WTA Tour Championships (1)
Premier tournaments (21):
 Premier Mandatory: Four combined tournaments with male professional players, with US$6.5 million in equal prize money for men and women (increased from $4.5 million in 2013). These tournaments are held in Indian Wells, Miami, Madrid, and Beijing.
 Premier Five: Five $2.8 million events in Doha/Dubai, Rome, Montreal/Toronto, Cincinnati, and Wuhan.
 Premier: 12 events with prize money from US$799,000 to US$2.5 million.
International tournaments: There are 32 tournaments, with prize money for all except four events at US$250,000. The exceptions are the Shenzhen Open, Moscow River Cup, Hong Kong Tennis Open and the Tianjin Open, each with prize money of US$750,000; and the year-ending WTA Elite Trophy in Zhuhai which has prize money of US$2.3 million.

WTA rankings

WTA publishes weekly rankings of professional players.

Current rankings

See also
 WTA 125K series
 ITF Women's Circuit
 ATP Tour Association of Tennis Professionals Tour

References

 
Tennis tours and series
Women's tennis tournaments
Women's Tennis Association
Recurring sporting events established in 1973